Playfair is an impact crater in the Mare Australe quadrangle of Mars, located at 78.1°S  latitude and 126.2°W  longitude. It measures  in diameter and was named after  Scottish scientist and mathematician John Playfair. The naming was approved in 1973, by the IAU's Working Group for Planetary System Nomenclature.

Images
This picture was taken in the spring season on Mars when the temperature was rising.  During the winter, much frost accumulates. When the temperature goes up in the spring, the frost disappears in the thin Martian atmosphere and leaves behind the dark ground. The surface appears covered with dark spots when this defrosting process is occurring.

The dark spots can be seen in some of the pictures below.

See also 
 List of craters on Mars

References 

Mare Australe quadrangle
Impact craters on Mars